Biomedical Research Institute may refer to:
 Biomedisch Onderzoeksinstituut or BIOMED in Belgium
 Los Angeles Biomedical Research Institute or LA BioMed
 Part of Louisiana State University Health Sciences Center Shreveport